Paul Edward Gray (February 7, 1932 – September 18, 2017) was the 14th president of the Massachusetts Institute of Technology.  He is known for his accomplishments in promoting engineering education, practice, and leadership at MIT and in the world at large.

Early life and education
Born in Newark, New Jersey in 1932, Gray graduated from MIT in 1954 with a SB in electrical engineering, and was a member of the Phi Sigma Kappa fraternity. He subsequently obtained an SM and ScD from MIT in 1955 and 1960, both in electrical engineering, and served as an electronics instructor in the US Army from 1955-1957.

Massachusetts Institute of Technology
As an MIT professor, Gray specialized in researching and teaching semiconductor electronics and circuit theory. In 1969, he co-authored Electronic principles: Physics, models, and circuits, which became a standard textbook on fundamental principles of solid-state electronics technology.

Gray rapidly rose through the MIT administration, serving as associate dean for student affairs (1965-1967), associate provost (1969-1970), and then dean of the School of Engineering (1970-1971). Under MIT president Jerome Wiesner, Gray served as chancellor (1971-1980). From 1980-1990, he served as president of MIT, and then as chairman of the MIT Corporation (1990-1997).  

At MIT, Gray is credited with helping to establish the Undergraduate Research Opportunities Program (UROP), the Leaders for Manufacturing program, and the ongoing affiliation with the Whitehead Institute for Biomedical Research. He led the Task Force on Educational Opportunity (1968-1973), and encouraged undergraduate curriculum reforms in the 1980s that strengthened the humanities, social sciences, and biology.  He broadened MIT's traditional engineering programs to also encourage development of management skills.

In 1982, Gray became an inaugural member of Ronald Reagan's White House Science Council, where he served for four years. He was a member of the Council's Panel on the Health of Universities, and was also vice chairman of the Council on Competitiveness.

After retiring from chairmanship of MIT, Gray returned to teaching and advising undergraduate students. He was a professor of electrical engineering and president emeritus of MIT, and a life fellow of the IEEE.

Gray died on September 18, 2017 in Concord, Massachusetts from complications of Alzheimer's disease.

Bibliography

References

 

1932 births
2017 deaths
MIT School of Engineering faculty
Presidents of the Massachusetts Institute of Technology
American electrical engineers
Fellow Members of the IEEE
Members of the United States National Academy of Engineering
Neurological disease deaths in Massachusetts
Deaths from Alzheimer's disease